Events from the year 1929 in Sweden

Incumbents
 Monarch – Gustaf V
 Prime Minister – Arvid Lindman

Events

The newspaper Arbetar-Tidningen established

Births

 24 January – Anders Kvissberg, sport shooter.
 28 January – Vanja Blomberg, gymnast.
 6 February – Sixten Jernberg, cross country skier (died 2012).
 10 April – Max von Sydow, actor
 14 May – Åke Ortmark, radio journalist, author and television presenter (died 2018)
 29 June – Bertil Norman, orienteering competitor 
 21 July – Birger Asplund, hammer thrower
 12 August – Carl Axel Petri, politician and judge (died 2017)
 4 September – Bror Stefenson, Swedish Navy admiral (died 2018) 
 6 October – Karin Lindberg, gymnast.

Deaths
 11 January – Elfrida Andrée, first female organist  (born 1841)
 21 June –  Birger Sjöberg, novelist, poet and songwriter  (born 1885)
 Augusta Braunerhjelm, playwright  (born 1839)
 Ottilia Littmarck, actress (born 1834)
 6 September - Anna Pettersson, lawyer (born 1861)

References

 
Sweden
Years of the 20th century in Sweden